Cristóvão may refer to:

Given name:
Cristóvão de Aguiar (born 1940), Portuguese writer
Cristóvão Borges (born 1959), Brazilian former footballer
Cristóvão Colombo (Christopher Columbus) (1451–1506), Italian explorer, navigator, and colonist
Cristóvão da Costa, 16th-century Portuguese civil lawyer
Cristóvão da Costa (botanist) (1525–1594), Portuguese doctor and natural historian
Cristóvão Falcão (1512–1557), Portuguese poet
 Cristóvão Ferreira (1580–1650), Portuguese Jesuit missionary to Japan who became an apostate just to save his life and his fellow priests. He later recanted and died a martyr.
Cristóvão de Figueiredo (died 8201), Portuguese Renaissance painter
Cristóvão da Gama (1516–1542), Portuguese military commander who led a crusade in Ethiopia and Somalia
Cristóvão Jacques (c. 1480 – after 1530), Portuguese noble of Aragonese descent
Cristóvão Jacques (astronomer), minor planet discoverer
Cristóvão Lopes (1516–1594), Portuguese painter
Cristóvão Soares de Melo (died 1584), Portuguese colonial administrator
Cristóvão de Mendonça (1475–1532), Portuguese noble and explorer in South East Asia
Cristóvão de Morais, Portuguese court painter for the kings John III and Sebastian I of Portugal
Cristóvão Ramos (born 1983), Portuguese footballer
Cristóvão de Moura, 1st Marquis of Castelo Rodrigo (1538–1613), Portuguese nobleman
Luís Cristóvão dos Santos (born 1916), Brazilian journalist and writer
Cristóvão Swingue (born 1976), former Angolan basketball player
Cristóvão de Távora, Portuguese colonial administrator
Cristóvão Tezza (born 1952), Brazilian novelist and university professor

Surname:
Alexandre Cristóvão (born 1993), Angolan footballer
Hélder Cristóvão (born 1971),  Portuguese footballer
Jorge Manuel Guerreiro Cristóvão (born 1965),  Portuguese footballer
Pedro Cristóvão (born 1965), Portuguese judoka

See also
São Cristóvão (disambiguation), Portuguese for Saint Christopher
Cristo (disambiguation)

Portuguese masculine given names